The Khmer Power Party (KPP) is a Cambodian pro-American political party founded on 18 March 2010 by Cambodian-American Sourn Serey Ratha. It did not officially register until March 2015. The party is in favor of abolishing the monarchy, and establish a second Khmer Republic government.

Serey Ratha was charged and put in jail in August 2016 for criticizing the government’s deployment of troops to the Laos border. He than receive a royal pardon a year later But Sophorn refused to restore him as president but will give him a title of honorary president instead. 
Serey Ratha than threatened to file a complaint against Sophorn for allegedly forging public documents to secure the title of party president. Serey Ratha has also asked the Interior Minister to inspect a letter dated September 2017 allegedly forged by Sophorn to appoint himself as president without consent. Later both of them establish a new Party, Serey Ratha form Khmer Reform Party whiled Sophorn form Khmer Win Party. Both of them claim as the Successor of Khmer Power Party.

See also
Social Republican Party

References

2010 establishments in Cambodia
Anti-communist parties
Cambodian democracy movements
Far-right political parties
Far-right politics in Asia
Nationalist parties in Cambodia
Republicanism in Cambodia
Political parties established in 2010
Political parties in Cambodia
Republican parties in Cambodia